Stringtown School District is one of three districts located in Atoka County Oklahoma. It is public school district in the town of Stringtown, Oklahoma that consists of two schools, an elementary school and a high school/junior high. The high school and junior high are located in the same building. The schools share the same cafeteria located between the schools.

References 

Education in Atoka County, Oklahoma
School districts in Oklahoma